White Water Landing may refer to:
White Water Landing (Cedar Point), a water ride at Cedar Point in Ohio
White Water Landing (Dorney Park), a water ride at Dorney Park in Pennsylvania